Coccochondra is a genus of flowering plants in the family Rubiaceae. There are four species native to the Guayana Highlands of northern South America.

These plants are low shrubs with tough leaves, small inflorescences of funnel-shaped flowers, and raphides in their tissues.

Species
 Coccochondra carrenoi (Steyerm.) C.M.Taylor
 Coccochondra durifolia (Standl.) C.M.Taylor
 Coccochondra laevis (Steyerm.) Rauschert
 Coccochondra laevis subsp. laevis
 Coccochondra laevis subsp. maigualidae J.H.Kirkbr.
 Coccochondra phelpsiana (Steyerm.) C.M.Taylor

References

External links
Coccochondra in the World Checklist of Rubiaceae

Further reading
Taylor, C. M. (2011). The genus Coccochondra (neotropical Rubiaceae) expanded. Plant Ecology and Evolution, 144(1), 115–118.

Rubiaceae genera
Psychotrieae
Flora of northern South America
Guayana Highlands